The administrative regions of the Federal District are administrative divisions of the Federal District, Brazil.

History
The division of the Federal District into administrative regions was made official through the 1964 federal law no. 4.545. Prior to this law, the regions were not officially defined, but their seats already existed and were often called satellite cities, with the exception of Brasília.

The administrative regions are territorial subdivisions of the Federal District, for which physical limits, established by public power, define the jurisdiction of government action for purposes of administrative decentralization and coordination of public services of a local nature.

This action is exerted through the intermediary of each regional administration.

Broadly speaking, the administrative region would be the set of urban, suburban and rural areas belonging to the control of an urban center (seat of the administrative region).

The physical-administrative boundaries are subdivided into urban and rural areas in discriminated then, according to the macrozoning of the Federal District, established by Article 11 of the Supplementary Law No. 17, dated 28/01/97 regarding the Director Plan of Territorial Ordering of DF - PDOT.

URBAN ZONE: of Dynamism, of Consolidation, of Controlled Use.

RURAL ZONE: of Dynamism, of Diversified Use, of Controlled Use.

Each administrative region hosts a corresponding regional administration, which is responsible for representing the government of the Federal District and promoting the coordination of local public services.

Each regional administration is headed by a regional administrator appointed by the Governor of the Federal District.

List of administrative regions

See also
Administrative region (Brazil)
Geography of Brazil
List of cities in Brazil

References 

Distrito Federal